Ulothrix flacca is a small filamentous marine algae.

Description
This species grows as small tufts of green unbranched filaments growing to no more than 10 cm long forming woolly masses. Cells 14.4 - 32.6μm broad and 4.8-9.6μm Ulothrix pseudoflacca and Ulothrix consociata are considered to be forms of Ulothrix flacca by some  biologists. Sometimes difficult to distinguish Ulothrix from Urospora.

Distribution
Common all around the British Isles. Recorded from Scandinavia south to Portugal, in the Mediterranean and the Black Sea. Also all around the world into the Pacific.

Habitat
found on rocks, stones and epiphytically on other algae.

References

Ulotrichaceae